The Archdeacon of Clonfert was a senior ecclesiastical officer within the Diocese of Kilmacduagh in County Galway, Ireland until 1625; the Diocese of Clonfert and Kilmacduagh until 1834 when it became an office within the Diocese of Killaloe and Clonfert. The Archdeaconry can trace its history from Florence M'Anoglaigh who held office during 1333 through to the last discrete incumbent Edward Rush  who died in 1891.

References

 
Lists of Anglican archdeacons in Ireland
Religion in County Galway
 
Diocese of Limerick and Killaloe